Barrowford is a large village and civil parish in the Pendle district of Lancashire, England. It is situated to the north of Nelson on the other side of the M65 motorway, and forms part of the Nelson conurbation. It also comprises the area of Lowerford (not to be confused with its neighbour Higherford). The parish has a population of 6,171. The community is located near the Forest of Bowland, an Area of Outstanding Natural Beauty while the Borough of Pendle is at the southern edge of the Yorkshire Dales.

Barrowford is situated on the Marsden–Gisburn–Long Preston turnpike. One of the original toll houses, dating from 1804 to 1805, can still be seen at the junction with the road to Colne, complete with a reproduction of the table of tolls which were paid.

The toll house was restored in the 1980s and is owned by the trust which operates nearby Pendle Heritage Centre. Barrowford is located about half a mile from the Leeds and Liverpool Canal, and a set of seven locks leads to the highest section of the canal between Barrowford and Barnoldswick.

About a mile on from the locks heading towards Leeds is Foulridge Tunnel known locally as the "Mile Tunnel". The packhorse bridge near Higherford Mill is the oldest in Barrowford, dating back to the end of the 16th century. It formerly lay on the old main road to Gisburn, which was superseded by the Turnpike road built in 1804. In September 2006, this mill was featured on the programme by BBC, Restoration.

The village has a modern Anglican church (St Thomas') built to replace the original church of 1839, which burnt down in 1964.

St Thomas's Primary School recently moved from its Victorian premises to a new building next door to the church. The village has two rivers: Pendle Water, which flows through the town with trout that can often be seen, and Colne Water, which joins Pendle Water behind the site of the now demolished Samuel Holden cotton mill and flows down from the moors above the town of Colne; again this river holds good trout.

The first residential home for the deaf was established in Lancashire at Barrowford in 1929. Today, the community is predominantly residential.

History

Barrowford has been a centre for textile production since at least the 16th century when a fulling mill is recorded as being in the village. Until the late 18th century, the manufacture of woollen cloth was the primary industry, but in 1780 the fulling mill was rebuilt by Abraham Hargreaves as a cotton mill.

The diarist Elizabeth Shackleton documented her life here. She died in 1781 at Pasture House.

The cotton mill was powered by a water wheel and fed by water drawn off at the weir on Pendle Water. The mill reservoir is now the ornamental pond in Barrowford Park, whilst remains of the mill survive in the corner of the nearby children's playground. For the next fifty years, cotton cloth was woven in the many handloom weavers' cottages which can still be seen along the village's main road.

As power looms were introduced into the cotton industry in north east Lancashire in the 1820s, weaving gradually became a factory industry and production moved from the home to the massive weaving sheds which began to be constructed. At its peak, the industry boasted some 10,000 looms and "employed several thousand local people". 

One of the last examples of a working weaving shed could be seen at the East Lancashire Towel Company, but the firm,  moved to premises in Nelson, and ceased production in the United Kingdom altogether. The site of the former mill was redeveloped by Booths supermarket, which opened in November 2014.

Another weaving shed at Higherford Mill has been converted to artists' workshops. By the 1860s, the village was heavily reliant on the cotton mills for employment, and, along with the rest of Lancashire, was badly affected by the Cotton Famine during the American Civil War. The wall alongside the river opposite Barrowford Park was built during this period to provide work for unemployed weavers: the milestone, which projects from the wall, is dated 1866.

Governance
Barrowford was once a township in the ancient parish of Whalley. This became a civil parish in 1866, and then in 1894 the urban areas became an urban district up until 1974. The part of Blacko parish historically in Lancashire was created from the remainder, with the exception of a small area across Pendle Water, which became part of Nelson.

The parish is split between the Barrowford and Blacko and Higherford wards of Pendle Borough Council.  It is in the Pendle parliamentary constituency, which is coterminous with the borough.

Demography
According to the United Kingdom Census 2011, the parish has a population of 6,171, a small increase from 6,039 in the 2001 census.  The town forms part of a wider urban area, which had a population of 149,796 in 2001. A similar but larger, Burnley Built-up area defined in the 2011 census had a population of 149,422.

The racial composition of the town in 2011 was 95.3% White (93.8% White British), 3.8% Asian, 0.1% Black, 0.6% Mixed and 0.2% Other. The largest religious groups were Christian (70.2%) and Muslim (3.2%). 72.7% of adults between the ages of 16 and 74 were classed as economically active and in work.

Media
The daily newspaper, Lancashire Telegraph, covers Barrowford in its Burnley, Pendle and Rossendale edition. The Nelson Leader, a weekly publication, also covers Barrowford.

See also

Listed buildings in Barrowford

References
Citations

External links

 Jim Sanderson's Barrowford - a selection of personal information and topics of historical interest
 Barrowford Parish Website
 BBC Sunday Stroll in Blacko, Higherford and Barrowford

Towns and villages in the Borough of Pendle
Civil parishes in Lancashire